House of Hammer is an American documentary television miniseries directed by Elli Hakami and Julian P. Hobbs. The documentary revolves around the life of American actor Armie Hammer and his family—who were involved in 2021 in various accusations after several complaints from the actor's ex-girlfriends. The three-part series premiered on September 2, 2022, on Discovery+.

References

External links
 

2020s American documentary television series
2020s American television miniseries
2022 American television series debuts
2022 American television series endings
Documentary television series about crime in the United States
English-language television shows